Felipe José Feres Moreira (born 15 January 1981), known as Felipe Moreira, is a Brazilian football coach and former player.

Career
Felipe Moreira was a Ponte Preta youth graduate. After suffering a severe knee injury at the age of 22, he retired.

Felipe Moreira subsequently joined his father's staff, as an assistant manager. In December 2014 he was named Bragantino assistant, despite the club lacking a first team manager.

In 2015 Felipe Moreira returned to Ponte Preta, again as an assistant. On 7 October, after Doriva's departure to São Paulo, he was named interim manager.

On 2 December 2016, after Eduardo Baptista's departure to Palmeiras, Felipe Moreira was named manager of Ponte ahead of the 2017 season.

In November 2022, Moreira was appointed head coach of Nejmeh in the Lebanese Premier League. He resigned only one week later citing family reasons.

Personal life
Felipe Moreira's father, Marco Aurelio Moreira, was also a footballer and manager. He too played and managed Ponte Preta.

References

External links
Grande Área profile 

1981 births
Living people
Sportspeople from Campinas
Brazilian footballers
Association football midfielders
Associação Atlética Ponte Preta players
Brazilian football managers
Campeonato Brasileiro Série A managers
Associação Atlética Ponte Preta managers
Nejmeh SC managers
Lebanese Premier League managers
Brazilian expatriate football managers
Brazilian expatriate sportspeople in Lebanon
Expatriate football managers in Lebanon